Martin Sköld (born 2 October 1970 in Sparreholm, Södermanland) is a Swedish musician who played bass and keyboards in the Swedish alternative rock band Kent. Alongside lead singer Joakim Berg he was responsible for writing the band's music.

See also
 Music of Sweden

References

External links
 kent.nu – Official website
 kentjunkie.com – English Kent fan site
 English translations of Kent lyrics
 
 

1970 births
Swedish male musicians
Living people
Swedish bass guitarists
Kent (band) members